Denny Thorley is an American video game designer.

Career
In 1995, Denny Thorley and Jordan Weisman formed a new company, FASA Interactive and then FASA Corporation (the RPG company) provided FASA Interactive with a license for its properties in return for stock.

Thorley was also president of Day 1 Studios. MechAssault was initiated when Thorley approached Jon Kimmich of Microsoft about developing an original BattleTech game built from the ground up to support console play.

References

Living people
Video game designers
Year of birth missing (living people)